Bili is a village in the municipality of Marzəsə in the Astara Rayon of Azerbaijan.

References

Populated places in Astara District